Dance with Death is a studio album by American jazz pianist Andrew Hill featuring performances recorded in 1968 but not released on the Blue Note label until 1980. The album features Hill with saxophonist Joe Farrell, trumpeter Charles Tolliver, bassist Victor Sproles and drummer Billy Higgins performing six originals with an alternate take added to the 2004 CD reissue.

Reception

The Allmusic review by Thom Jurek awarded the album 4½ stars calling it "a phenomenal record, one that wears its adventure and authority well".

Track listing
All compositions by Andrew Hill
 "Yellow Violet" - 5:32
 "Partitions" - 5:52
 "Fish 'n Rice" - 7:31
 "Dance With Death" - 6:40
 "Love Nocturne" - 6:44
 "Black Sabbath" - 6:24
 "Dance With Death" [Alternate Take] - 7:14 Bonus track on CD reissue

Personnel
Andrew Hill - piano
Charles Tolliver - trumpet
Joe Farrell - soprano saxophone (track 1), tenor saxophone (tracks 2-7)
Victor Sproles - bass
Billy Higgins - drums

References

Blue Note Records albums
Andrew Hill albums
1980 albums
Albums recorded at Van Gelder Studio
Albums produced by Francis Wolff